Tylomelania connectens is a species of freshwater snail with an operculum, an aquatic gastropod mollusk in the family Pachychilidae.

This species was originally described as a subspecies.

Distribution 
This species occurs in Poso River, Sulawesi, Indonesia.

Ecology 
Tylomelania connectens is a riverine species.

References

External links 
 

connectens
Gastropods described in 1898